Sven Helge Hamrin (30 March 1941 – 25 January 2018) was a Swedish cyclist who competed at the 1964 Olympics. He finished 50th in the individual road race and won a bronze medal in the team time trial, riding with the Fåglum brothers. The same year he won the road race at the national championships.

In 1970 he was involved in an auto accident in Norway, as a result of which he remained in a coma for 45 days. Eventually he recovered and resumed cycling, even though one of his legs was six centimeters shorter as a result of multiple surgeries.

References

External links
 

1941 births
2018 deaths
Swedish male cyclists
Olympic bronze medalists for Sweden
Cyclists at the 1964 Summer Olympics
Olympic cyclists of Sweden
Olympic medalists in cycling
People from Härnösand
Medalists at the 1964 Summer Olympics
Sportspeople from Västernorrland County
20th-century Swedish people
21st-century Swedish people